Alto Rio Novo is a Brazilian municipality in the state of Espírito Santo. Its population was 7,874 (2020) and its area is 228 km².

References

Municipalities in Espírito Santo